Jérémy Baillard (born  in Enghien-les-Bains) is a French bobsledder.

Baillard competed at the 2014 Winter Olympics for France. He teamed with driver Thibault Godefroy, Vincent Ricard and Jérémie Boutherin in the France-2 sled in the four-man event, finishing 23rd.

As of April 2014, his best showing at the World Championships is 23rd, coming in the two-man event in 2012.

References

1990 births
Living people
Olympic bobsledders of France
People from Enghien-les-Bains
Bobsledders at the 2014 Winter Olympics
French male bobsledders
Sportspeople from Val-d'Oise